"Messin' Around" is a song by American rapper and singer Pitbull, featuring vocals from Spanish singer Enrique Iglesias. It was released on April 8, 2016, as the lead single of Pitbull's tenth studio album, Climate Change. The song interpolates "Take It on the Run" by REO Speedwagon. It also recycles a verse by Pitbull from the song "Kiss from Those Lips" by Pitbull and Qwote.

Music video 
On May 25, 2016, Pitbull  uploaded the music video for "Messin' Around" on his YouTube and Vevo account.

Track listing 
Digital download
"Messin' Around"  — 3:43

Live performances 
Pitbull sang the track for the first time on television on May 24, 2016, during the Dancing with the Stars season finale on an outdoor stage.

Pitbull performed the song live with REO Speedwagon on the TV series Greatest Hits in 2016. That version of the song was also released as a single on iTunes.

He also performed the song at the 2016 CMT Music Awards with English singer Leona Lewis and The Voice winner Cassadee Pope.

Charts

Weekly charts

Certifications

References

External links
 

 

2016 singles
2016 songs
Songs written by Pitbull (rapper)
Songs written by Enrique Iglesias
Songs written by Gary Richrath
Pitbull (rapper) songs
Enrique Iglesias songs
Song recordings produced by Dr. Luke
Song recordings produced by Cirkut (record producer)
Songs written by Jimmy Thörnfeldt
Songs written by AJ Junior